"Fairly Local" is a song written and recorded by American musical duo Twenty One Pilots. It was uploaded to YouTube on March 16, 2015, released as the lead single from their fourth studio album Blurryface on the following day. The song was their first to chart on the Billboard Hot 100 chart, peaking at number 84, and has since been certified Platinum in the United States.

Background 
"Fairly Local" served as the lead single of Blurryface, and was an introductory track to the titular character. Its two verses are written to contradict each other almost word for word, creating a duality in Joseph's personality between himself and "Blurryface", represented in the second refrain through the use of a vocoder, a reprise of the original refrain with deepened pitch.

The song describes and recounts Joseph's experiences with troubled fans while touring for Vessel, the third studio album, stating in an interview with Paper:

"Fairly Local" makes references to mainstream radio play extensively. In an interview with Radio.com, Joseph explained, "We understand that there's a certain type of song that is aerodynamic enough to be on the radio. A lot of people would say that that's a good song. I guess we thought, man, do we have to write a record that has a bunch of songs that fall into what would be considered a radio song? That was something that I was kind of working through. Now I understand all these rules cause we've been around it one time. Do I have to obey them completely or can I just continue writing the way that I've always written? So, no, we're not rebellious about it. We don't think that the radio sucks or whatever. It was just something that we had to get off our chest."

Within the song, the fourth wall is broken as Joseph references the band's listeners, coining "the few, the proud, the emotional", later becoming a collective term for Twenty One Pilots fans.

Composition 
"Fairly Local" is an electronic rock and drumstep song that runs for three minutes and twenty-seven seconds, featuring hip hop and pop rap influences. The song alters between sparse verse instrumentation, electronic breakdowns in the choruses, and an ambient instrumental bridge. This gives "Fairly Local" a distinct sound described as intense and eerie. According to the sheet music published at Musicnotes.com by Alfred Music, it is written in the time signature of common time at a tempo of 115 beats per minute. "Fairly Local" is composed in the key of F# minor, while Joseph's vocal range spans two octaves, from a low C♯3 to a high of C♯5.

Music video 
The music video for  "Fairly Local" was uploaded on YouTube without prior notice one day before the song's release as a single, and was directed by Mark C. Eshleman of Reel Bear Media. The video is shot in a dark, snow filled and presumably abandoned building, with Dun playing the drums in a large room and Joseph singing in various rooms of the building throughout the video. "Fairly Local" introduces the black paint on Joseph's hands and neck, which symbolised the presence of Blurryface. As the video progresses, Joseph's movements become increasingly frantic and erratic, while Dun's drums fly into the air and disappear, one by one.

Track listing

Personnel
Twenty One Pilots
 Tyler Joseph – lead vocals, keyboards, programming, guitar, synthesizers
 Josh Dun – drums, percussion
Additional musicians
 Ricky Reed – bass guitar, programming

Charts

Peak positions

Year-end charts

Certifications

Release history

References

External links

2015 singles
Twenty One Pilots songs
2015 songs
Fueled by Ramen singles
Electronic rock songs
Electronica songs
American rock songs
American hip hop songs
Song recordings produced by Greg Wells
Songs written by Tyler Joseph